Daniel Duarte may refer to:

 Daniel Duarte (Gibraltarian footballer) (born 1979), Gibraltarian football midfielder
 Daniel Duarte (Mexican footballer) (born 1985), Mexican football defender
 Daniel Duarte (baseball) (born 1996), Mexican baseball player